This article covers the history of Yampil, a city located in Vinnytsia Oblast of central Ukraine.

References

History of Vinnytsia Oblast